CPP and cpp may refer to:

Economics and finance
 Canada Pension Plan, a contributory, earnings-related social insurance program in Canada
 Capital Purchase Program, a preferred stock and equity warrant purchase program in the US
 Consistent pricing process, any representation of "prices" of assets in a market
 Cost per point, the cost of an advertising campaign, relative to the rating points delivered

Companies
 Cleveland Public Power, an electricity generation and distribution company in Ohio, US
 CPP Group, a British company selling life assistance products

Organizations
 Centre for Public Policy, a policy think tank in India

Political parties
 Cambodian People's Party, a political party of Cambodia
 Chin Progressive Party, a political party in Myanmar
 Communist Party of Pakistan, a political party in Pakistan
 Communist Party of the Philippines, a political party in the Philippines
 Convention People's Party, a socialist political party in Ghana
 Pan-African Patriotic Convergence (French: Convergence patriotique panafricaine), a political party in Togo

Professional certifications
 Certified Payroll Professional, a professional certification conferred by the American Payroll Association
Certified Pharmacist Practitioner, a certification on licenses of pharmacists in the state of Montana
 Certified Professional Photographer, degree or certification given by the Professional Photographers of America and used after your signature as initials, CPP
 Certified Protection Professional, a security management designation conferred by ASIS International

Science and technology
 C preprocessor, a program that processes the C programming language before it is compiled
 C++ (file extension: .cpp), a programming language
 Carte parallelogrammatique projection, an equirectangular map projection
 Chinese postman problem, a mathematical problem in graph theory
 meta-Chlorophenylpiperazine, a chemical
 Controllable-pitch propeller, is a type of propeller used in Marine propulsion. It may also refer to a controllable-pitch propeller used in aeronautics.
 Cycloparaphenylene

Medicine
 Cell-penetrating peptide, are short polycationic sequences
 Central precocious puberty, a condition in which puberty begins abnormally early
 Cerebral perfusion pressure, regarding blood flow to the brain
 Coronary perfusion pressure, regarding blood flow to the heart muscle
 Certificate of pharmaceutical product, a certificate which establishes the status of a pharmaceutical product
 Chronic pelvic pain, a medical condition
 Critical process parameters, key variables affecting the production process
 Chronic pain patients , a medical group with multiple painful conditions

Other uses
 California State Polytechnic University, Pomona (Cal Poly Pomona), a four-year university in California, US
 Canadian Public Policy, a quarterly peer-reviewed academic journal
 Coal preparation plant, a processing facility for washing raw coal
 Concrete Pavement Preservation
 Conditioned place preference, a form of Pavlovian conditioning
 Celebrity Paranormal Project, an American reality TV show which aired in 2006
 Counter promenade position, a dance position
 Clean Power Plan, US policy attempting to curb emissions from electricity generation
 Child-Parent Psychotherapy, a dyadic psychotherapy for children and parents who have experienced trauma, especially through domestic-violence

See also
 CP (disambiguation)
 CP2 (disambiguation)
 CCP (disambiguation)